Puzer-Mama or Puzur-Mama (puzur4-Dma-ma) was a ruler of Lagash before Gudea, circa 2200 BCE. Though he adopted the title of King (lugal), Puzer-Mama shows kinship with future Lagashite kings in the religiosity of his inscriptions.

He took control of Lagash during Shar-kali-sharri's reign, when troubles with the Guti left the Sargonic king with only "a small rump state whose center lay at the confluence of the Diyala and Tigris river." (Frayne 1993 p. 186)

Puzer-Mama's royal inscription — wherein he receives the various gifts of the gods appropriate to rulership: power by Ningirsu, intelligence by Enki, and position by Inanna, (Frayne 1993 p. 272) — may be contrasted with the contemporary religious element in Shar-kali-sharri's various inscriptions: a call for the gods to punish any who alter his inscriptions, and specifically to "tear out his foundations and destroy his progeny" (one of a number of curses for protection found in royal inscriptions starting with the reign of Sargon.)

Puzer-Mama appears in Babylonian inscription (BM 2310) as one of the ancient rulers of Lagash, particularly the list of "The rulers of Lagaš":

 
According to other inscriptions however, his tutelary god was Shulutula.

Puzur-Mama also appears in a letter about territorial disputes between two Governors, apparently sent to Shar-Kali-Sharri:

 

Puzer-Mama also appears as "King of Lagash" in a document also naming the Elamite ruler Puzur-Inshushinak, suggesting the synchronicity of the two rulers.

References

Sources

Frayne, Douglas R. (1993). Sargonic and Gutian Periods (Toronto, Buffalo, London. University of Toronto Press Incorporated)

23rd-century BC Sumerian kings
Kings of Lagash